Irish–Kosovan relations are foreign relations between Ireland and Kosovo. Kosovo declared its independence from Serbia on 17 February 2008 and Ireland recognised it on 29 February 2008.

Relations

On 20 May 2011 Ireland's ambassador to Budapest, Hungary John Deady submitted his credentials to Pristina, Kosovo.

Refugees
In 1999, Ireland took 1,000 refugees. This number was criticised by the United Nations Human Rights Commissioner and former President of Ireland Mary Robinson who called it, the complacency and selfishness of the Irish for accepting only 1,000 refugees from Kosovo.

Peacekeeping
Ireland has sent peacekeepers to Kosovo. It was the first time Ireland has commanded such a force in a NATO-led United Nations mandated peace support operation. In 2007, Irish Brigadier General Gerry Hegarty, took over command one of the five multi-national task forces . A ceremony was held in Kosovo at noon on 15 April 2010 to mark the end of Ireland's major involvement in the KFOR peace mission.

See also 
 Foreign relations of the Republic of Ireland
 Foreign relations of Kosovo
 Ireland–NATO relations
 Ireland–Yugoslavia relations

Notes and references
Notes:

References:

 
Bilateral relations of Kosovo
Kosovo